Livistona drudei is a species of palm tree. It is endemic to Queensland in Australia, where it grows in moist forest habitat. It is endangered by loss of habitat.

References

drudei
Palms of Australia
Endangered flora of Australia
Nature Conservation Act vulnerable biota
Endangered biota of Queensland
Vulnerable flora of Australia
Flora of Queensland
Taxonomy articles created by Polbot
Taxa named by Ferdinand von Mueller